Jaroslav Romanchuk (born January 10, 1966) is a Belarusian libertarian economist and politician.

He currently works as President of the Scientific Research Mises Center.

Life and career

Romanchuk was born into a Polish family in Sapotskin, Grodno Region.

He graduated from the Minsk State Linguistic University in 1991 and finished postgraduate doctoral studies at the Belarusian State University. He later studied at various educational programmes abroad.

In 1994 Romanchuk joined the liberal conservative United Civil Party where he was advisor to Chairman of in 1996–2000. Since April 2000 Romanchuk is Deputy Chairman of the party.

From December 1995 till December 1996 Romanchuk worked at the Supreme Council of the Republic of Belarus as a senior economist at the Commission for economic policy and reforms.

In 2002 the Mises Scientific Research Center was created at the Analytical Center «Strategy» in Minsk with the aim to promote liberal values and free market economy.

Jaroslav Romanchuk has over 1000 publications on economic problems (pension reform, effectiveness of state poverty programs, comparative analysis of social economic models, crisis of welfare state in the West etc.) in various mass media.

He is the prize-winner of the Atlas Network Sir Anthony Fisher Award 2006, winner of Templeton award 2006, 2007; winner of International Society for Individual Liberty Marshal Bruce Evoy award for promoting liberty in the world (2003).

Romanchuk is participant of numerous conferences both in Belarus and abroad, author of Concept of Pension Reform for Belarus, alternative Budget and Tax system for Belarus, Law on Privatization, law on social security and other pieces of legislation. Chairman of the working group on social economic program of joint democratic forces of the Republic of Belarus (2005–2008).

Author of National Business Platform for business in Belarus (2006-2007), NBP-2008.

Publications

Books by Romanchuk 
 Belarus: Choosing Economic Future (in Russian) 1999,
 Liberalism. Ideology of a happy person (2007),
 In search of economic miracle. Lessons for Belarus 2008

Books with Romanchuk as co-author 
 Belarus: road to the future. Book for the parliament (2005),
 Business in Belarus. In circle One (2006)
 Economic Constitution for the Republic of Belarus (2007)

References

External links
 Scientific Research Mises Center
 Jaroslav Romanchuk in World Security Network
 Jaroslav Romanchuk in Atlas Network
 ROMANCHUK Jaroslav in United Civil Party
 Winners of the 2006 Fisher Awards
 Templeton Freedom Award Winners (2004-2007)
 An Interview with Jaroslav Romanchuk
 Why Totalitarian States Survive Nowadays — Jaroslav Romanchuk (text of Vilnius speech) by International Society for Individual Liberty.

1966 births
Living people
People from Hrodna District
Belarusian scientists
Belarusian economists
Belarusian libertarians
Austrian School economists
Belarusian people of Polish descent
Soviet people of Polish descent
United Civic Party of Belarus politicians
Candidates in the 2010 Belarusian presidential election